Fred Nii Amugi (born 5 November 1948) is a Ghanaian born veteran actor best known for his roles in Holby City, Beasts of No Nation and The Cursed Ones. He rose to prominence for his role in 1985 television series "Opinto".

Early life 
Fred Amugi was born at Teshie, Accra, Ghana on 5 November 1948. He attended Broaks basic and Junior high School. He then attended Takoradi Senior High School and Nungua Senior High school. He joined the civil service for thirty-three years and served as acting director of Supply in Ghana's Ministry of Finance.

Career 
Amugi began his acting career in 1970 in Drama and Documentaries until 1985 when he starred in his first movie "Opinto". The television series brought him into the limelight.

Amugi has appeared in numerous movie roles, including local Ghanaian movies, Shoe Shine Boy (2013), Nyame Bekyere 1&2 (2015), Menua Paa Nie (2016), Housekeepers (2016) among others. His first international role came in 2005 when he played the character Kwame Attakora in the BBC drama Holby City.
 He later starred in Netflix 2015 movie, Beasts of No Nation as "Pastor". Amugi played the character Pastor Uchebo in the 2015 British award-winning movie "The Cursed Ones".

Filmography

Film

Television

Awards and nominations

References

External links
 
Fred Nii Amugi at thetv.adms.co.ke

1948 births
Living people
Ghanaian male film actors
People from Accra
20th-century Ghanaian male actors
21st-century Ghanaian male actors